The Supreme Court of Argentina, officially known as the Supreme Court of Justice of the Argentine Nation (CSJN), is the highest court of law of the Argentine Republic. It was inaugurated on 15 January 1863. However, during much of the 20th century, the Court and the Argentine judicial system in general, lacked autonomy from the executive power. The Court was reformed in 2003 by the decree 222/03.

The Supreme Court functions as a last resort tribunal. Its rulings cannot be appealed. It also decides on cases dealing with the interpretation of the constitution (for example, it can overturn a law passed by Congress if deems it unconstitutional).

The members of the Supreme Court are appointed by the President with the agreement of at least two thirds of the present Senate members in a session convened for that purpose, and can only be removed by an impeachment process called juicio político ("political trial"), initiated by the Chamber of Deputies and carried out by the Senate, exclusively on grounds of improper behaviour.

Headquarters
The Supreme Court of Argentina is headquartered in the Palacio de Justicia, in the Buenos Aires neighbourhood of San Nicolás (the surrounding area is commonly known as "Tribunales" due to the palace's location). The building was designed by French architect Norbert Maillart in 1906, and initially inaugurated in 1910. Subsequent works, both logistical and aesthetic, continued until 1942, and among its most noteworthy monuments are Justice, by Rogelio Yrurtia, and José de San Martín, by Luis Perlotti.

History
Until the 2000s, the Court lacked independence from the executive branch in many cases. Several of its justices were accused of forming an "automatic majority", who consistently agreed on votes having to do with interests of the administration. Authors have underlined a sort of "spoils system", leading to changes of the Court's composition following each new political majority. The Supreme Court has been characterized by both "instability in its composition" and inconsistency in its rulings. However, reforms in 1994 and 2003 have improved the democratic character of the Court.

From the Infamous Decade to the 1994 reform 

At the beginning of the 20th century, the Court was composed of five magistrates. Following the 1930 military coup by José Félix Uriburu, which initiated the Infamous Decade, the five justices recognized the new authorities and officialized the rupture of constitutional order, thus beginning a precedent which would affect much of Argentina's history.

During Juan Perón's presidency, the Supreme Court approved decrees which had not been voted by the Congress. In 1947, after the conservative phase of the military rule, General Juan Perón initiated a trial against three of the Supreme Court judges, and the fourth one resigned. Thus, only one of the preceding judges remained in place. From 1946 to 1955, the judicial system in general was in agreement with the Justicialist official policies.

Following the 1955 catholic-nationalist Revolución Libertadora, the five magistrates of the Supreme Court were deposed by the military in power.

When the constitutional government of Arturo Frondizi (UCRI) came to power in 1958, three judges resigned. During Frondizi's term, the number of judges of the Supreme Court was increased, while all Peronist judges of the judicial system were removed.

In 1963, the following democratic government, of Arturo Illia (UCRP), also attempted to increase the numerical composition of the Supreme Court. However, the military coup of Juan Carlos Onganía (known as Revolución Argentina) deposed Illia before implementation of the reform. As soon as the military came to power, they pressured the Supreme Court judges to resign. The latter renounced their offices only a short time before return of the constitutional order in 1973.

An ad hoc tribunal was formed on May 24, 1973. The five new judges were all Peronists, and none of them came from the judicial family, nor had followed a career in courts. Following the March 1976 military coup, the military junta attempted to depose all the Supreme Court magistrates. The latter, however, accepted the imposition of an act formulating the objectives of the so-called "National Reorganization Process", which culminated in state illegal repression and in the disappearances of 30,000 people.

Following the democratic transition, the highest responsible military members of the dictatorship were put on trial in the Trial of the Juntas (1985). However, this trial was not supervised by the Supreme Court, but by the Federal Criminal Appeal Court.

After Carlos Menem's election as president, the Argentine judicial system was the target of much pressure from the executive power. In 1989, Menem expanded Argentina's highest court from five to nine members, and chose the four new justices. The Senate approved Menem's choice on April 19, 1990, during a secret parliamentary session which lasted 7 minutes, and to which the opposition was not invited. The resignation of judge Bacqué insured an "absolute majority" for Menemism.

The Supreme Court since 1994 and the 2003 reform 

The 1994 constitutional reform slightly changed the mode of nomination of the justices: although they were still proposed by the executive power and approved by the Senate, an absolute majority was no longer needed, 2/3 of the votes of the present members of parliament being sufficient for approval. It also introduced amparo, hábeas corpus and hábeas data.

In the 2000s, since the interim presidency of Eduardo Duhalde and especially during the term of Néstor Kirchner which started in 2003, all members of Menem's "majority" have either been removed or resigned. Dr. Antonio Boggiano, the last of these, was removed on 29 September 2005. Not all justices were replaced, so there were still two vacancies.

The amicus curiae process, allowing third parties to a case to depose a written text before the Court in order to defend general interest, was then formalized. The process was used in 2001, when Spanish justice sent an international arrest warrant for responsibles of human rights violations in Argentina. An NGO then deposed a text, as third party, before the Argentine court, setting forth the judicial arguments needed to either extradite or judge suspects of human rights violations (an alternative known as subsidiary universal jurisdiction).

This change was an important phase in the 2005 ruling which stated that crimes of forced disappearances were crimes against humanity (Caso Simon). Two years earlier, the Congress had declared the amnesty laws (1986 Ley de Punto Final and 1987 Ley de Obediencia Debida) unconstitutional, thus opening up the way for the trials of suspects of human rights violations during the dictatorship.

Another important reform took place in 2003. Effectively, since 19 June 2003, by presidential decree, candidates for a seat in the Supreme Court must be presented by the Executive Branch for consideration. The nominees' resumes must be made public and announced by the Ministry of Justice, and can be discussed in the media and elsewhere by NGOs, professional law associations, academic and human rights groups, and all citizens in general. After three months, the President, with this advice, can then choose to present the nominee to the Argentine Senate, which must decide on the nomination, needing at least a two-thirds majority for a positive vote.

Furthermore, on 2 July 2003, the Senate approved a reform which forced its Commission to publicize its choices regarding confirmation of the nominations of magistrates of the judicial system and of the public ministry.

Finally, following a colloquium organized by the CELS NGO, Chief Justice Petracchi agreed to publish the Court's decisions.

At times, most recently near the end of 2006, several justices complained that the President's delay in appointing the two vacancies in the Court was problematic, because a nominally nine-member Court needs a majority of five to sign consensual decisions, and demanded that either replacements be appointed for former justices Augusto Belluscio and Antonio Boggiano (as required by law), or that Congress pass a law reducing the Court to seven justices (thus reducing the majority to four). On 9 November 2006 Senator Cristina Fernández de Kirchner (the President's wife) presented a legislative bill to repeal Law 24774, which dictated the increase to nine justices, in order to eventually return to the original number of five. Most of the members of the Court welcomed this project.

List of presidents 

 Francisco de las Carreras (1863–1870)
 Salvador Maria del Carril (1870–1877)
 José Benjamín Gorostiaga (1877–1887)
 Benjamin Victorica (1887–1892)
 Benjamín Paz (1892–1902)
 Abel Bazán (1903)
 Antonio Bermejo (1904–1929)
 José Figueroa Alcorta (1929–1931)
 Roberto Repetto (1932–1946)
 Antonio Sagarna (1946–1947)
 Tomas Darío Casares (1947–1949)
 Felipe Santiago Pérez (1949)
 Luis Ricardo Longhi (1949–1952)
 Rodolfo Guillermo Valenzuela (1952–1955)
 Alfredo Orgaz (1955–1960)
 Benjamín Villegas Basavilbaso (1960–1964)
 Aristóbulo Donato Aráoz de Lamadrid (1964–1966)
 Eduardo Ortiz Basualdo (1966–1973)
 Miguel Ángel Bercaitz (1973–1976)
 Adolfo R. Gabrielli (1976–1983)
 Genaro R. Carrió (1983–1985)
 Ricardo Levene (1990–1993)
 Julio Nazareno (1993–2003)
 Carlos Fayt (2003–2004)
 Enrique Santiago Petracchi (2004–2007)
 Ricardo Lorenzetti (2007–2018)
 Carlos Rosenkrantz (2018–2021)
 Horacio Rosatti (2021–present)

Current justices
The current composition of the Supreme Court is as follows:

Assessment
The renewal of the Supreme Court in the first years of the Kirchner administration was advertised and is usually acknowledged as a positive step, bringing more independence to the Judicial Branch and addressing issues of ideological bias.

Until mid-2004, all of the justices were male. They were considered conservative, as most were devout Catholics. In contrast, the two most recently appointed justices (Elena Highton and Carmen Argibay) are female; Argibay, former ad litem judge on the International Criminal Tribunal for the Former Yugoslavia and former president of the International Association of Women Judges, is a self-professed feminist and atheist, who supports the legalization of abortion in Argentina. Eugenio Zaffaroni (the first to be designated through the public nomination method) is viewed as a politically center-left-wing guarantist Justice, and also a scholar of critical criminology.

Further reading
 Case law of the Supreme Court of Argentina
 Ministry of Justice.
 On the newer justices:
 Argentine President's First 100 Days Break From 30 Years of Business-As-Usual – The renewal process sponsored by the Kirchner administration.
 Elena Highton:
 Argentina gets first female Chief Justice – NDTV.com, 29 June 2004.
 The new Supreme Court member – Buenos Aires Herald.

References

External links

 

Argentina
Government of Argentina
Law of Argentina
1863 establishments in Argentina
Judiciary of Argentina
Courts and tribunals established in 1863